Tenchi Muyo! Ryo-Ohki is an OVA anime series created by Masaki Kajishima. Directed by Hiroki Hayashi and produced by Anime International Company, the OVA was originally released in Japan on 25 September 1992. It was produced by AIC. Pioneer LDC produced the first two OVA series, and later by VAP for the third OVA series. Pioneer Entertainment (later Geneon) had licensed the first two OVA series and released them on Laserdisc, VHS and DVD. The third OVA series was licensed by Funimation Entertainment. After Geneon's departure from the North American market in November 2007, Funimation rescued the first two OVA series, along with a handful of other Tenchi Muyo! properties (except for Pretty Sammy's OVAs and TV series).  Funimation released a limited edition Blu-ray/DVD combo pack on December 4, 2012.  The first two OVAs aired on Cartoon Network's Toonami block from July 3, 2000 to July 19, 2000.

First series
{|class="wikitable" width="98%"
|- style="border-bottom: 3px solid #CCF"
! width="30" | # !! Title !! width="150" | Original airdate
! style="width 30%;" | English airdate 
|-

|}

Second series
{|class="wikitable" width="98%"
|- style="border-bottom: 3px solid #CCF"
! width="30" | # !! Title !! width="150" | Original airdate
! style="width=150%;" | English airdate
|-

|}

Third series

{|class="wikitable" width="98%"
|- style="border-bottom: 3px solid #CCF"
! width="30" | # !! Title !! width="150" | Original airdate
! style="width=150%;" | English airdate
|-

|}

Fourth series

{|class="wikitable" width="98%"
|-
!style="background: #CCF" width="2%"|#
!style="background: #CCF"|Title
!style="background: #CCF" width="15%"|Original airdate
|-

|}

Fifth series

{|class="wikitable" width="98%"
|-
!style="background: #CCF" width="2%"|#
!style="background: #CCF"|Title
!style="background: #CCF" width="15%"|Original airdate
|-

|}

References

Ryo-Ohki